Fear City: New York vs The Mafia is an American true crime web docuseries about New York City's Five Families: the Gambino, Colombo, Bonanno, Lucchese, and Genovese crime organizations.

Premise

The series is told from the point of view of the Federal Bureau of Investigation, detailing how the implementation of wiretaps were able to bring down the mob in the Mafia Commission Trial. The series, released on Netflix on July 22, 2020, also featured appearances from Donald Trump (in archival footage), Rudy Giuliani, Michael Franzese and John Alite.

Episodes

Release 
Fear City: New York vs The Mafia was released on July 22, 2020, on Netflix.

Reception
On review aggregator Rotten Tomatoes, the series holds an approval rating of 71% based on 17 reviews, with an average rating of 7.25/10. The website's critics consensus reads: "Compelling interviews and a slick style help Fear City entertain, but those already familiar with the case will find few new insights." On Metacritic, it has a weighted average score of 61 out of 100, based on 10 critics, indicating "generally favorable reviews".

Reviewing the series for The Hollywood Reporter, Daniel Fienberg said it featured "by-the-numbers storytelling with a law enforcement perspective" and wrote: "I wish there were more consistency to when and how the reenactment device is used, but there are general potholes of sloppiness throughout Fear City." John Anderson of The Wall Street Journal said the series "offers a skewed history of the investigations into organized crime in 1970s-80s New York".

References

External links 
 
 

2020 American television series debuts
2020 American television series endings
2020s American documentary television series
2020s American television miniseries
English-language Netflix original programming
Netflix original documentary television series
Television shows set in New York City
Works about the American Mafia
Television series about prosecutors